Oberriexingen is a town in the district of Ludwigsburg, Baden-Württemberg, Germany. It is situated on the river Enz, 20 km northwest of Stuttgart, and 13 km west of Ludwigsburg.

References

Ludwigsburg (district)